Wu Yi Fan (
; born 6 November 1990), known professionally as Kris Wu, is a Canadian rapper, singer, actor, model, and convicted serial rapist. He is a former member of South Korean-Chinese boy band Exo and its subgroup Exo-M under SM Entertainment, before leaving the group in 2014. Wu was active as a solo artist and actor in Mainland China, and had starred in several number-one box office hits including Mr. Six and Journey to the West: The Demons Strike Back, which are among the highest-grossing Chinese films of all time in China. He made his Hollywood debut in XXX: Return of Xander Cage.

On 31 July 2021, Wu was detained by Beijing police after multiple rape allegations emerged on Chinese social media. In August 2021, the People's Procuratorate of Chaoyang District of Beijing approved his arrest on suspicion of rape. On 25 November 2022, the Beijing court sentenced Wu to a total of 13 years in prison, to be followed by deportation from China.

Early life 
Li Jiaheng was born on 6 November 1990, in Guangzhou, Guangdong, to Stacey Yu Wu (born Wu Xiuqin) and Li Kaiming. His parents divorced when he was a toddler and he was raised solely by his mother.

At the age of 10, he moved to Vancouver, Canada, with his mother. He returned to China at the age of 14 and attended Guangzhou No. 7 Middle School for a brief period, after which he and his mother went back to Vancouver, where he attended Point Grey Secondary School and Sir Winston Churchill Secondary School under the name Kevin Li. At the age of 17, his legal name was changed to Wu Yi Fan.

At the age of 18, Wu auditioned for SM Entertainment's Canadian global auditions, which were held in Vancouver; after passing the auditions, he became a trainee for the company and was offered a role in Exo in 2012.

Career

2012–2014: Debut with Exo 

On 17 February 2012, Wu was introduced as the eleventh member of Exo. In April 2012, Exo made their debut and quickly became one of the most popular K-pop groups in South Korea and internationally, achieving commercial success with their studio album XOXO and their hit song "Growl" in 2013. The album became the first album by a Korea-based artist in twelve years to sell over one million copies, and is the 12th best selling album of all time in Korea. Before leaving the group, Wu was featured on Exo's Overdose album, which was released in May 2014 and became the best selling album of 2014 in South Korea.

2014–2016: Solo debut and other activities 
Wu released "Time Boils the Rain" as part of the soundtrack for the Chinese box office hit Tiny Times 3 in July 2014. In the following year, he became the youngest celebrity to have a wax figure at Madame Tussauds Shanghai and was named "Newcomer of the Year" by Esquire China.

Wu made his film debut in Somewhere Only We Know, directed by Xu Jinglei. The film was released on 14 February 2015, and debuted at No.1 on the Chinese box office, grossing US$37.81 million in six days following its release. He won the "Best Newcomer Award" at the 3rd China International Film Festival London for his performance.

He then starred in his second film Mr. Six, which closed at the Venice Film Festival. The film was a box office hit, grossing over US$137 million and becoming one of the highest-grossing films in China. The same year, Wu starred alongside Liu Yifei in So Young 2: Never Gone and romance melodrama Sweet Sixteen. He won the "Newcomer with the Most Media Attention" award at the Shanghai International Film Festival and "Best Actor" at the Gold Crane Award for his performance. Wu also starred in the blockbuster fantasy film L.O.R.D: Legend of Ravaging Dynasties, directed and written by Guo Jingming.

2017–2021: International appearances and Antares 
Wu made his runway debut at Burberry's Fall 2016 Men's Show in London. He also took part in the 2016 NBA All-Star Game as a member of Team Canada, coached by Drake.

In January 2017, Wu made his U.S. film debut in D. J. Caruso's XXX: Return of Xander Cage. He released the single "Juice", featuring Vin Diesel in the music video, as part of the soundtrack on 19 January . Wu then starred in Stephen Chow's film, Journey to the West: The Demons Strike Back, playing Tang Sanzang.

In February 2017, Wu represented China at the 59th Annual Grammy Awards ceremony in Los Angeles. The same month, Wu accepted his second invitation to play in the 2017 NBA All-Star Game in New Orleans. Forbes listed Wu their 30 Under 30 Asia 2017 list which comprises 30 influential people under 30 years old who have made substantial effect in their fields.

In July 2017, Wu co-starred in Luc Besson's science fiction film Valerian and the City of a Thousand Planets.

In October 2017, Wu released "Deserve", featuring American rapper Travis Scott. Upon its release, "Deserve" placed No. 1 on the U.S. iTunes chart, making Wu the only Chinese artist to achieve the feat. At the end of 2017, Wu released a single, "B.M.". Kris released another single, "Miss You" featuring Zhao Liying on Christmas Day 2017. The music video was released on 28 December.

Wu starred in the 2018 Hong Kong-made action thriller Europe Raiders, alongside Tony Leung.

As of April 2018, future music from Wu will be released internationally, excluding Japan and Korea, through a partnership of Universal Music China, Interscope in the United States and Island Records in the United Kingdom Wu's debut album Antares featuring the 2018 singles "Like That" and "Freedom" (featuring Jhené Aiko) was released on 2 November 2018.

On 19 April 2019, Wu released a single, "Big Bowl, Thick Noodle", the music video for which was viewed over 90 million times on streaming site Miaopai. Wu then embarked on his Alive Tour, performing at cities across China. On 6 November 2019, his 29th birthday, Wu released a second single, "Eternal Love", along with an accompanying micro film starring himself and Japanese model Kōki.

On 22 April 2020, Wu released the four-track EP Testing, preceded by the single "Aurora" on 15 April. The EP was pre-ordered one million times just 87 minutes after being made available on Tencent streaming platform QQ Music, marking a new record for the platform. The EP features three Chinese songs and one in English.

Personal life 
Wu can speak five languages: Mandarin, Cantonese, English, Korean, and Japanese.

In August 2019, during the 2019–20 Hong Kong protests, Wu shared photos of the Chinese flag accompanied by the hashtags "the Chinese national flag has 1.4 billion flag bearers" and "I am a flag bearer" on his official Weibo account.

Endorsements and ambassadorship 
In 2015, Wu became the youth ambassador for the 3rd Silk Road International Film Festival in Xian.

In 2016, he became the first endorser for Mixxtail. Mercedes-Benz chose Wu as their brand ambassador in China for their Smart division and introduced the limited edition "Kris Wu Edition" smart. Wu has also been made the global ambassador for I.T Cashback Card under American Express Hong Kong. The brand made him chief design advisor and the face of their latest in-house brand, Under Garden. He designed the lookbook for the latest collection. Burberry chose Wu as their global ambassador in 2016, making him the first non-British as well as the first Asian person to be the face of the brand. It was reported that Burberry experienced a growth in sales and awareness with Chinese shoppers thanks to Kris' campaign.

Wu made his international debut as the brand ambassador of Bulgari at 2017 BaselWorld.

Philanthropy 
In June 2014, Wu joined Heart Ali, a project started by Fan Bingbing and Chen Lizhi (the general manager of Beijing Maite Media). The charity project is aimed at helping children suffering from congenital heart defects in Ngari Prefecture in Tibet.

On 21 January 2016, he launched his own charity project called Extraordinary Honorary Court (不凡荣誉球场), a collaboration project with Sina, Weibo Sports, and Weibo Charity. The goal is to spread basketball in middle schools in China to encourage all basketball-loving youth to continue their dreams of pursuing this sport. Wu was also announced as the ambassador for China's Jr. NBA program and is part of the program's mentor group.

Legal issues and controversies

SM Entertainment lawsuit 
On 15 May 2014, Wu filed a lawsuit against the agency to terminate his contract. SM Entertainment claimed to be completely taken aback despite having dealt with several disputes regarding their contracts in the past.

On 30 July 2015, SM Entertainment filed a lawsuit against Wu and the Chinese companies working with him at the Beijing court, stating that "these activities have infringed the rights of the EXO members and SM, and have caused great financial harm to us and our partners. This is not only an abuse of the system, but also an unethical move that has betrayed the trust of this company and the other members." The following day, Wu released a statement defending himself stating that SM Entertainment had made him leave the group for several months and that SM Entertainment's way of mistreating and neglecting their artists resulted in serious health issues: he had to take medication to be able to work from July 2013 to January 2014, when he was diagnosed with myocarditis. A settlement was reached that he will be under their management in only Korea and Japan.

Sexual abuse conviction 

On 8 July 2021, Du Meizhu, a 19-year-old Chinese college student, posted allegations online accusing Wu of a pattern of sexual assault involving multiple females, some underage, while they were unconscious and under the influence of alcohol. Through the Chinese social media platform Weibo, Du stated she was raped while intoxicated on 5 December 2020, at age 18, and that she was speaking for at least seven other victims, two of whom were minors at the time of the crime.

The allegations were denied by Wu, and were then investigated by the Beijing Public Security Bureau and other authorities. Multiple companies, including Porsche, Bulgari, and Lancôme, ended ties with Wu and either dropped him as a brand ambassador or suspended existing endorsement deals.

Wu was detained by police in Beijing on 31 July 2021, and formally arrested on 16 August 2021, on suspicion of rape. On 25 November 2022, Chaoyang District People's Court in Beijing sentenced Wu to a total of 13 years in prison and deportation from China after serving his sentence for rape and group lewdness. Wu was also fined an additional ¥600 million yuan (US$84 million) for tax evasion.

Filmography

Film

Television

Variety show

Discography 

 Antares (2018)

Awards and nominations

Forbes China Celebrity 100

References

External links 

 

1990 births
21st-century Canadian male actors
21st-century Canadian male singers
21st-century Canadian rappers
21st-century Chinese male actors
21st-century Chinese male singers
21st-century Chinese singers
Canadian contemporary R&B singers
Canadian expatriates in China
Canadian expatriates in South Korea
Canadian hip hop singers
Canadian male actors of Chinese descent
Canadian male film actors
Canadian male models
Canadian male rappers
Canadian male singers
Canadian music industry executives
Canadian musicians of Chinese descent
Canadian people convicted of rape
Canadian people convicted of tax crimes
Canadian people imprisoned abroad
Canadian philanthropists
Canadian pop singers
Canadian record producers
Cantopop singers
Chinese contemporary R&B singers
Chinese emigrants to Canada
Chinese expatriates in South Korea
Chinese idols
Chinese male film actors
Chinese male models
Chinese male rappers
Chinese people convicted of rape
Chinese people convicted of tax crimes
Chinese philanthropists
Chinese pop singers
Chinese record producers
Exo members
K-pop singers
Korean-language singers of Canada
Living people
Male actors from Guangdong
Male actors from Guangzhou
Male actors from Vancouver
Mandarin-language singers
Musicians from Guangzhou
Musicians from Vancouver
Naturalized citizens of Canada
People who lost Chinese citizenship
Prisoners and detainees of the People's Republic of China
Singers from Guangdong